Eucalyptus quadrans is a species of mallee or a small tree that is endemic to the southwest of Western Australia. It has smooth, greyish bark, narrow lance-shaped adult leaves, flower buds in groups of seven, white flowers and cup-shaped fruit that are square in cross-section.

Description
It has smooth greyish bark, sometimes with rough, flaky or scaly bark near the base of the trunk. Flowering occurs from August to November and the flowers are white.

TaxonomyEucalyptus quadrans was first formally described in 1993 by Ian Brooker and Stephen Hopper in the journal Nuytsia from material collected by Brooker near Truslove in 1984. The specific epithet (quadrans'') refers to the four-sided base of the floral cup.

Distribution
This mallee grows in near-coastal areas from Mount Ney near Esperance to Lake Magenta near Newdegate.

Conservation status
This eucalypt is classified as "not threatened" by the Western Australian Government Department of Parks and Wildlife,

See also
List of Eucalyptus species

References

Eucalypts of Western Australia
quadrans
Myrtales of Australia
Plants described in 1993
Taxa named by Ian Brooker
Taxa named by Stephen Hopper